The sixth European Athletics Team Championships took place on 20 and 21 June 2015.

Super League

Place: Central Stadium, Cheboksary, Russia

Participating countries

 Belarus, Finland and Norway were promoted from 2014 First League.

Men's events

Women's events

Score table

Final standings

First League

Place: Pankritio Stadium, Heraklion, Greece

Participating countries

 Czech Republic, Netherlands and Turkey were relegated from 2014 Super League.
 Latvia and Switzerland were promoted from 2014 Second League.

Men's events

Women's events

Score table

Final standings

Second League
Place: Stara Zagora (Bulgaria)

As the 2017 Second League will feature 12 teams, no teams were relegated this year.

Participating countries

 Hungary and Slovenia were relegated from 2014 First League.
 Cyprus and Iceland were promoted from 2014 Third League.

Men's events

Women's events

Score table

Final standings

Third League
Place: Baku National Stadium, Baku, Azerbaijan

The third league of the 2015 European Athletics Team Championships will be a part of the 2015 European Games, held in Baku, Azerbaijan.

Participating countries

 AASSE

 (forfait)

 Austria and Slovakia were relegated from 2014 Second League.

Men's events

Women's events

 The original women's steeplechase winner, Chaltu Beji of Azerbaijan, was disqualified after giving a positive doping test for ostarine.

Score table

Final standings

References

Official Super League site

European Athletics Team Championships
Team
European